Pendulum is a 2014 Bengali language Indian neo noir thriller based on surrealism time travel written and directed by Soukarya Ghosal and starring Radhika Apte, Rajesh Sharma, Sreelekha Mitra, Rajatava Dutta, Subhasish Mukherjee, Shantilal Mukherjee, Samadarshi Dutta. The film is based on a surrealistic painter who can provide time travel experience to his audience and can physically take them into his virtual world of painting. Through his painting, he travels time and tries to settle the
disputes of several lives in Kolkata, affecting different individuals in a chain system.

Plot 
A car accident caused by Nandita (Radhika Apte), a young girl from the advertisement world is the sole truth moment of this hyperlink cinema, where five different stories are intertwined. The accident is shown thrice in the film, from three different povs of time. 

First, it is shown in the real-time frame, second, it is shown in the flashback of Anirudhha (Anindya Banerjee), one of the characters of the film, and for the third time, it is shown in the virtual space of a Painter’s (Subhasish Mukherjee) work. 

The Painter lives in a dilapidated house in north Kolkata as one of the tenants. He practices a strange kind of art in his own closed room. After every painting is done, he takes out his secret bottle of colour from an iron safe. The colour is black and never ever spills out from the bottle even if it drops on the floor uncorked. The secret colour is actually made with the same element that creates black whole out there in space. The painter draws a labyrinth with that colour on the painting which actually creates a warm hole that acts as a shortcut to the virtual world of his canvas. A non-Bengali builder (Rajesh Sharma) buys the house and plans for demolishing it to make a shopping mall.

Cast

Soundtrack

The Music of the film is composed by debutant music director Mainak Nag Chowdhury. The sound design is done by Sukanta Majumder. Out of five original songs, Chandril Bhattacharya and Anindya Chatterjee who won National Film Award for best lyrics have penned two. Ghosal has written the other three songs. The soundtrack was released by Cozum Analytics. The full music album was released in 2014.

Reception
The film was released on 7 March 2014 in India and received positive critical reviews."The use of music in Pendulum is very intelligent, it creeps up on your senses. The music has come together very seamlessly, never intruding in the mood of the scenes," says Filmmaker Srijit Mukherji in an interview to The Telegraph. The film bagged three awards in the 4th Mirchi Music Awards Bangla.

Awards

References

External links 
 
 
 Music awards Bangla 2014

2014 films
Bengali-language Indian films
2010s Bengali-language films
Indian thriller films 
Films set in West Bengal
2014 drama films
Films set in Kolkata